Cingoli  is a town and comune of the Marches, Italy, in the province of Macerata, about  by road from the town of Macerata.  It is the birthplace of Pope Pius VIII.

History
The town occupies the site of the ancient Cingulum, a town of Picenum, founded and strongly fortified by Julius Caesar's lieutenant Titus Labienus (probably on the site of an earlier village) in 63 BCE at his own expense. Its lofty position at an elevation of about  made it of some importance in the civil wars, but otherwise little is heard of it. Under the Roman Empire it was a municipium.

Main sights
Cingoli is also known as the "Balcony of Marche" ("Il Balcone delle Marche") because of its belvedere (viewpoint) from which, on a clear day, the sight may encompass all of the Marche and further across the Adriatic Sea to the Croatian mountain tops.

Religious buildings
 Cingoli Cathedral (Concattedrale di Santa Maria Assunta)
 Collegiate church of Sant'Esuperanzio, Cingoli (Collegiata di Sant'Esuperanzio): Gothic church 
 Santuario di Santa Sperandia
 San Benedetto
 San Francesco
 San Filippo Neri
 San Giacomo
 San Girolamo
 San Nicolò
 Santo Spirito
 Santa Caterina d'Alessandria
 San Domenico

Secular buildings
 Palazzo municipale
 Biblioteca comunale Ascariana http://www.bibliotecacingoli.it/

Museums
 Pinacoteca comunale "D. Stefanucci" named after Donatello Stefanucci
 Museo archeologico statale di Cingoli
 Museo del Lago
 Museo del Sidecar

Sport
Cingoli has been host to the Italian Sidecarcross Grand Prix a number times and will be hosting it again in 2010, on 16 May.

Twin towns — sister cities
Cingoli is twinned with:

  Aprilia, Lazio, Italy (2004)

References

External links
 Cingoli news
 Cingoli sport
 History of Cingoli: http://www.antiqui.it/cingoli.htm

Cingoli
Cities and towns in the Marche
Roman sites of the Marche